This is the discography of pop singer Jerry Vale.

Studio albums
 Girl Meets Boy (with Peggy King and Felicia Sanders) (1955)
 I Remember Buddy (1958)
 I Remember Russ (1958)
 The Same Old Moon (1959)
 Jerry Vale's Greatest Hits (1961)
 I Have But One Heart (1962)
 Arrivederci, Roma (1963)
 The Language of Love (1963)
 Be My Love (1964)
 Till the End of Time and Other Great Love Themes (1964)
 Christmas Greetings from Jerry Vale (1964)
 Have You Looked into Your Heart (1965)
 There Goes My Heart (1965)
 Standing Ovation at Carnegie Hall (1965)
 It's Magic (1966)
 Great Moments on Broadway (1966)
 Everybody Loves Somebody (1966)
 More Jerry Vale's Greatest Hits (1967)
 The Impossible Dream (1967)
 Time Alone Will Tell and Other Great Hits of Today (1967)
 I Hear a Rhapsody (1968)
 You Don't Have to Say You Love Me (1968)
 This Guy's in Love with You (1968)
 Till (1969)
 As Long as She Needs Me  (1969)
 Where's the Playground Susie? (1969)
 With Love, Jerry Vale (1969)
 Hey Look Me Over  (1970)
 Sings 16 Greatest Hits of the 60's (1970)
 Let It Be (1970)
 More (1971)
 Born Free (1971)
 We've Only Just Begun (1971)
 The Jerry Vale Italian Album (1971)
 I Don't Know How to Love Her (1971)
 Sings the Great Hits of Nat King Cole (1972)
 Jerry Vale's All-Time Greatest Hits (1972)
 Alone Again (Naturally) (1972)
 Jerry Vale Sings the Great Italian Hits (1973)
 Jerry Vale Sings the Great Love Songs  (1973)
 Love Is a Many-Splendored Thing (1973)
 What a Wonderful World (1973)
 Jerry Vale's World (1974)
 Free as the Wind (1974)
 Greatest of Jerry Vale (1974)

Reissue

 The Jerry Vale Italian Album (1991)
 17 Most Requested Songs (1991)
 Standing Ovation (1991)
 Essence of Jerry Vale (1994)
 Love Me the Way I Love You (1995)
 Personal Christmas Collection (1995)
 Best of: Live (1996)
 Great Italian Hits (1998)
 Greatest Hits (1998)
 Sings the Great Hits of Nat King Cole (1998)
 Till (1998)
 Same Old Moon/It's Magic (1998)
 I Remember Buddy (2000)
 I Remember Russ (2000)
 Language of Love/Till the End of Time (2000)
 Be My Love/Have You Looked into Your Heart (2000)
 Love Songs (2001)
 Super Hits (2001)
 Essential '50s Recordings (2001)
 I Have But One Heart/Arrivederti Roma (2002)
 I Remember Buddy/I Remember Russ (2003)
 Very Best of Jerry Vale (2003)
 Have Yourself a Merry Little Christmas (2003)
 You Don't Have to Say That You Love Me/I Don't Know How to Love Her (2003)
 Girl Meets Boy/Wish Upon a Star (2003)
 There Goes My Heart/I Hear a Rapsody (2005)
 Great Jerry Vale (2005)
 Time Alone Will Tell/This Guy's in Love with You (2008)
 Seven Classic Albums (2014)
 And This Is My Beloved (2017)

Singles

References

Discographies of American artists
Pop music discographies